Benjamin O. Davis High School is a public high school located in unincorporated Harris County, Texas, USA, near Houston, and a part of the Aldine Independent School District.

It is classified as a 6A school by the UIL.  In 2019, the school received a C grade from the Texas Education Agency.

History and naming 
The school opened in 2012, and was named after Benjamin O. Davis, Jr., the commander of the Tuskegee Airmen.

Academics 
For the 2018–2019 school year, Davis High School received a C grade from the Texas Education Agency, with an overall score of 77 out of 100. The school received a C grade in two domains, Student Achievement (score of 71) and Closing the Gaps (score of 71), and a B grade in School Progress (score of 80) The school did not receive any of the seven possible distinction designations.

Athletics
The Davis Falcons compete in these sports:

Volleyball, Cross Country, Football, Basketball, Swimming, Water Polo, Soccer, Golf, Tennis, Track, Baseball & Softball

Demographics
In the 2018–2019 school year, there were 2,528 students. 31.7% were African American, 3.1% were Asian, 61.4% were Hispanic, 0.2% were American Indian, 0.1% were Pacific Islander, 2.5% were White, and 1.0% were two or more races. 81.0% of students were Economically Disadvantaged, 16.8% were English Language Learners, and 7.1% received Special Education services.

References

External links

 

Davis, Benjamin O.
2012 establishments in Texas
Educational institutions established in 2012